The Herbert A. Wagner Generating Station is an electric generating station located on Fort Smallwood Road north of Orchard Beach in Anne Arundel County, Maryland, just east of Glen Burnie, and is operated by the Raven Power Holdings, LLC, a subsidiary of Riverstone Holdings LLC. The H. A. Wagner station consists of natural gas fueled Unit 1, nominally rated at 133 MWe, coal-fired Unit 2 rated at 136 MWe, coal-fired Unit 3 rated at 359 MWe, and oil-fired Unit 4 rated at 415 MWe. Talen Energy will convert the coal-fired units to alternative fuels by 2025.

The station shares a  site adjacent to the Patapsco River with the Brandon Shores Generating Station. The Brandon Shores plant dominates the site with its  exhaust and  flue-gas desulfurization system stacks.

Fuel delivery
The Wagner and Brandon Shores Generating Stations consume approximately 4.8 million tons of coal annually. Coal for both stations and number 6 fuel oil for Wagner Unit 4 is delivered by barge. Although there is a railroad spur into the site that could be used for coal shipments to the site, it is unused and would require improvements to restore it to an operational state. An estimate in a 2007 report indicated that the cost of returning this rail line to operation with the necessary material handling equipment would potentially exceed US$20 million.

Natural gas for the Wagner Unit 1 is provided by a pipeline.

Dispatch of electricity
The electrical output of Brandon Shores Generating Station is dispatched by the PJM Interconnection regional transmission organization.

History
The Wagner Generating Station's oil-fired Unit 1 commenced operations in 1956. Unit 2, consisting of a Babcock & Wilcox 1800 psig steam boiler and General Electric single reheat steam turbine, began operations as a coal-fired plant in 1959. Coal-fired Unit 3, which has a Babcock & Wilcox 3500 psig supercritical boiler and a Westinghouse double-reheat cross compound turbine, commenced operations in 1966. The oil-fired unit 4 began operations in 1972.  Unit 2 was converted to fuel oil to comply with state and federal air quality requirements in 1972, and then modified to allow a return to burning coal in 1987. Units 2, 3, and 4 were also converted to use natural gas during startup operations in 1987. Additional air pollution controls were added to the plants in the 1980s.

The plant is named for Herbert Appleton Wagner (1867–1947), who was president of the Consolidated Gas and Electric of Baltimore, the predecessor company of Constellation Energy, from 1915 through 1942. Wagner also held a patent on a self-starting, single-phase motor and founded in 1891 the Wagner Electric Manufacturing Company in St. Louis, Missouri.

2012 sale
The plant was originally constructed by a predecessor company of Constellation Energy, which was later purchased by Exelon in 2012. On August 9, 2012, Exelon announced that it had reached an agreement, subject to regulatory approvals, for the sale of the Charles P. Crane, Brandon Shores, and Herbert A. Wagner Generating Stations to Raven Power Holdings LLC, a newly formed portfolio company of Riverstone Holdings LLC, for approximately $400 million. Exelon had committed to divest the plants as condition for regulatory approval of its merger with Constellation Energy to alleviate concerns regarding potential market power in the regional wholesale electricity market. The sale was completed on November 30, 2012.

Scheduled Closure 
On November 10, 2020 Talen Energy (parent company of Raven Power) announced a settlement with the Sierra Club that the plant would cease burning coal and convert to alternative energy sources by the end of 2025.

Cooling
All four Wagner units are cooled using water from intake structures from a basin on the Patapsco River using two circulating water pumps per unit. Water from units 1, 2, and 3 is returned to the river by a discharge canal upstream of the intake basin while water from unit 4 uses a discharge canal downstream of the intake basin.

See also

List of power stations in Maryland

References

External links
H.A. Wagner Generating Station - Talen Energy

Energy infrastructure completed in 1956
Energy infrastructure completed in 1959
Energy infrastructure completed in 1966
Energy infrastructure completed in 1972
Buildings and structures in Anne Arundel County, Maryland
Coal-fired power stations in Maryland
Natural gas-fired power stations in Maryland
Oil-fired power stations in Maryland